Law on State Capital is an omnibus law to relocate capital of Indonesia from Jakarta to Nusantara at East Kalimantan as new capital of Indonesia. The omnibus bill of the law was passed into law on 18 January 2022. and finally commenced on 15 February 2022.

Unusual in law making history of Indonesia, the law become the fastest law made in Indonesia after being law only 111 days after the bill introduced, with only 42 days processed at People's Representative Council and only 16 hours marathon discussion between the People's Representative Council and Indonesian government prior the passing into law for to be passed.

History 
Interest on capital relocation by Joko Widodo administration had been revived since 2017. On 23 August 2019, Jokowi submitted Presidential Letter No. R-34/Pres/08/2019. The Letter enclosed with 2 enclosures: (1) Presidential Study Report on Capital Relocation, and (2) Request on DPR Support for Capital Relocation. On 26 August 2019, Jokowi announced that the new capital would be partly in the Penajam North Paser Regency and partly in the Kutai Kartanegara Regency, both in East Kalimantan. The National Development Planning Ministry announced that the move would cost an estimated Rp 466 trillion (US$32.7 billion) and that the government intended to cover 19% of the cost, the remainder coming mainly from public-private partnerships and direct investment by both state-owned enterprises and the private sector.

Circa January 2020, a draft of the bill leaked to public. The draft, dated 14 January 2020, consisted of 10 chapters and 39 sections. The draft of the bill showed that 6 laws will be amended by time of the law enacted.

On 29 September 2021, Joko Widodo sent Presidential Letter No. R-44/Pres/09/2021 contained 2 enclosures: Bill on State Capital and Academic Draft on State Capital Relocation drafted by Ministry of National Development Planning. In the official draft of the bill, the bill consisted of 9 chapters and 34 sections. The provisional chapter of the bill showed that 3 acts (Law No. 25/1956, Law No. 47/1999, and Law No. 7/2002) will be amended and 1 act (Law No. 29/2007) will be repealed after the enactment of the law if certain conditions met.

On 18 January 2022, the bill passed into law. The law was passed unusually fast. 

On 19 January 2022, the final draft of the law somehow obtained by media and released to the public. The final draft of the law consisted of 11 chapters and 44 sections.

The law is commenced on 15 February 2022.

Criticisms and Challenges 
The law currently challenged by Indonesian right-wing activists, politicians, former military commanders/generals, and also Islamic activists and Islamic hard line mass organizations. The challengers, claimed from the Poros Nasional Kedaulatan Negara (PNKN, English: National Axis of State Sovereignty), claimed that the law is unneeded and requested the Constitutional Court to cancel the law. One of the PNKN member, Abdullah Hehamahua, former Corruption Eradication Commission advisor-turned-Islamist activist launched racial accusation with anti-Chinese tendency against the government, claiming that the project is an attempt to turn Jakarta as "Second Beijing". On 1 June 2022, the submitted cases: 39/PUU-XX/2022, 40/PUU-XX/2022, 47/PUU-XX/2022, 48/PUU-XX/2022, 53/PUU-XX/2022, and 54/PUU-XX/2022 were dismissed by the Constitutional Court. On 20 July 2022, another submitted cases: 25/PUU-XX/2022, 34/PUU-XX/2022, 49/PUU-XX/2022, and 66/PUU-XX/2022 also dismissed by the Constitutional Court. One case, Case No. 66/PUU-XX/2022, was a case rejected by the court after the submitter found to producing false signatures in submitted document, resulted the submitter unable to submit the case again.

External links 
All of these links are Indonesian:
 Legislation Record of Bill on State Capital.
 Presidential Letter No. R-44/Pres/09/2021.
 Draft of the Bill on State Capital.
 Academic Draft on State Capital Relocation.
 Final Draft of the Law on State Capital.
 Congress Final Report on Passing of the Bill of State Capital.

References 

Joko Widodo
Government of Indonesia
History of Indonesia
Omnibus legislation
Law of Indonesia
2022 in Indonesia